Alice Whitley  (6 February 1913 – 1990) was an Australian chemist and educator. Whitley focused on the science education of women and was a 50-year faculty member at her alma mater, the MLC School. She worked as a science teacher and headmistress. Whitley served as president of the Australian Science Teachers Association and the Association of Heads of Independent Girls' Schools.

Early life and education 
Alice Whitley was born on 6 February 1913 to Alfred and May Whitley in Stanmore, New South Wales. Whitley attended MLC School in Burwood, Sydney from 1921 to 1930 and was awarded Dux of College in 1930. She earned a degree in Science from the University of Sydney then taught mathematics at Brighton College, Manly and at SCEGGS Moss Vale, and was a science and mathematics teacher at MLC School, Burwood, Sydney from 1941 to 1952. From 1952 to 1954, Whitley attended London University where she earned a PhD for her thesis in chemistry before returning to MLC School as Head of Science & Deputy Headmistress from 1955 to 1959.

Career
Whitley was Headmistress of MLC School in Burwood, Sydney, where she had attended as a student, for a total of 12 years, from 1960 to 1972. She was the last Headmistress before 1972, when the positions of principal and headmistress were amalgamated. She was an unkind woman, who unfairly punished those pupils whose views she felt did not suitably align with the rigid Christian principles held by the school.

Whitley actively promoted the importance of science education through her involvement with the Australian Science Teachers Association (ASTA), where she was president from 1956 to 1957, and vice president from 1958 to 1959. She was a member of the Commonwealth Science Advisory Committee for State Secondary Schools and helped formulate the science syllabus for the new NSW Higher School Certificate. As an academic and professional in her own right, she contributed to scientific journals and co-authored two books. Whitley also advocated for a balanced education in particular with regards to art education, sport (by establishing a sport and physical education program in 1963) and the Girl Guides movement. At Speech Night in 1969 was quoted as lamenting the "lackadaisical attitude of a permissive society which places too much importance on examination results and not enough on the continuing process of learning" and stressed her commitment to the sports program.

Whitley was president of the Association of Heads of Independent Girls Schools (AHIGS) in 1963.

Honours and legacy
On 11 June 1966, Whitley was named a Member of the British Empire.

Whitley died aged 77 years old. A memorial service was held in her honour in Potts Hall at MLC School Burwood on the 25 August 1990. The plant molecular biologist Elizabeth Dennis, a former MLC student, quoted Whitley as an inspiring chemistry teacher. The library at MLC School (ILC = Independent Learning Centre) is named after Whitley. After her death, the Australian College of Educators (NSW Chapter) presented a "Dr Alice Whitley Award for Science Education".

Selected works

Journal articles

Textbooks

References

1913 births
1990 deaths
20th-century Australian educators
Australian chemists
Australian headmistresses
Australian Members of the Order of the British Empire
Australian women chemists
Australian women educators
People educated at MLC School
People from the Inner West (Sydney)
University of Sydney alumni
20th-century chemists
20th-century Australian women
Date of death missing
Place of death missing